Dinanath Singh Yadav is an Indian politician. He was elected to the Bihar Legislative Assembly from Paliganj constituency as the 2000 Member of Bihar Legislative Assembly as a member of the Rashtriya Janata Dal.

References

Bihar MLAs 2000–2005
Rashtriya Janata Dal politicians
Living people
People from Patna
Year of birth missing (living people)
Janata Dal (United) politicians